Zygometis is a genus of spider in the family Thomisidae described by Simon in 1901, containing the sole species Zygometis xanthogaster, or the milky flower spider or white flower spider, with a distribution from Thailand to Australia (including Lord Howe Island). They are ambush predators.

Description 
They are cream-white in colour, with brownish-red lines on the cephalothorax and abdomen. This coloration help them camouflage onto white flowers to ambush their prey. Females are 6.5 mm, while males are 3 mm.

Habitat
In Australia, they live from coastal forests to semi-arid areas. It is recorded in altitudes up to  661.5m .

Diet & ecology 
They are "too small" to harm humans, and prey on insects by ambush.

References

Thomisidae
Monotypic Araneomorphae genera
Spiders of Asia
Spiders of Australia